The reconstructed Proto-Germanic name of the Elder Futhark u rune  is *Ūruz meaning "wild ox" or *Ūrą "water". It may have been derived from the Raetic alphabet character u as it is similar in both shape and sound value. The name of the corresponding letter in the Gothic alphabet is urus.

Name

The Icelandic word for "rain" and the Old English for "aurochs" go back to two different Proto-Germanic words, *ūruz and *ūrą (although possibly from the same root). The Norwegian meaning "dross, slag" is more obscure, but may be an Iron Age technical term derived from the word for water (cf. the Kalevala, where iron is compared to milk).

Because of this, it is difficult to reconstruct a Proto-Germanic name for the Elder Futhark rune. It may have been *ūruz "aurochs" (see also Bull worship), or *ūrą "water". The aurochs is preferred by authors of modern runic divination systems, but both seem possible, compared to the names of the other runes: "water" would be comparable to "hail" and "lake", and "aurochs" to "horse" or "elk" (although the latter name is itself uncertain). The Gothic alphabet seems to support "aurochs", though: as the name of the letter 𐌿 u is urus.

Rune poems
It is recorded in all three rune poems, and it is called Ur in all, however with different meanings:

References 

Runes